Swander is a surname. Notable people with the surname include:

Mary Swander (born 1950), American author
Pinky Swander (1880–1944), American baseball player